The 1984 Jade Solid Gold Best Ten Music Awards Presentation was held in January 1985. It is part of the Jade Solid Gold Best Ten Music Awards Presentation series held in Hong Kong.

Top 10 song awards 
The top 10 songs (十大勁歌金曲) of 1984 are as follows.

Additional awards

References 
 Top ten songs award 1984, Tvcity.tvb.com 年度十大勁歌金曲頒獎典禮
 Additional awards 1984, Tvcity.tvb.com 勁歌金曲季選最受歡迎獎

Jade Solid Gold Best Ten Music Awards
Jade Solid Gold Best Ten Music Awards Presentation, 1984